The 3rd FINA Synchronised Swimming World Trophy was held December 5–7, 2008 in Madrid, Spain. It featured swimmers from 8 nations, swimming in four events: Duet Free, Duet Thematic, Team Free and Free Combination.

Participating nations
8 nations swam at the 2008 Synchro World Trophy:

Results

Final standings

References

FINA Synchronized Swimming World Trophy
2008 in synchronized swimming
2008 in Spanish sport
International aquatics competitions hosted by Spain
Synchronised swimming competitions in Spain